The 2016 Tour of Austria was the 68th edition of the Tour of Austria cycling stage race. The 1287.3 km (799.9 mi)-long race started in Vienna on 2 July with an individual time trial prologue, and concluded in Vienna on 9 July. This was the first time in several years that the race consisted of 7 stages plus a prologue. The race is part of the 2016 UCI Europe Tour, and is rated as a 2.1 event.

Schedule

Participating teams
Nineteen (19) team participated in the 2016 edition of the Tour of Austria.

Stages

Prologue
2 July 2016 — Kitzbüheler Horn, individual time trial (ITT)

Stage 1
3 July 2016 — Innsbruck to Salzburg,

Stage 2
4 July 2016 — Mondsee to Steyr,

Stage 3
5 July 2016 — Ardagger Markt to Sonntagberg,

Stage 4
6 July 2016 — Rottenmann to Edelweißspitze,

Stage 5
7 July 2016 — Millstatt to Dobratsch,

Stage 6
8 July 2016 — Graz to Stegersbach,

Stage 7
9 July 2016 — Bad Tatzmannsdorf to Vienna (Kahlenberg),

Classification leadership

Final standings

General classification

Mountains classification

Points classification

Best Austrian rider classification

Team classification

References

External links
 

Tour of Austria
Tour of Austria
Tour of Austria